St Barnabas Secondary School (known as Madzimbabwe Secondary School) is a secondary school in Wedza, Zimbabwe. The school offers classes from Form 1 to Form 4; there are two classes for each stage.

The school has two grounds for netball and two for football. Sporting activities include athletics, football, handball, volleyball, long jump, triple jump, high jump, and netball.

The school draws most of its students from Munodawafa, Mwedziwendira, Magadzire, Negombwe, Makurumure, Maisiri, Mucheni, and Chipenzi.

Schools in Zimbabwe